Lucas Whitney McGee is a former US Rowing national team member, former Oxford Blue Boat member, and former freshman coach of rowing at the University of Washington and Brown University. Luke began his rowing career at 15 years old while attending Loyola Academy after his father Ray and brother Josh encouraged him to try out for the team.  After high school, he attended Yale University for a year, but then transferred to Brown University where he rowed competitively and was captain of his crew.  Luke returned to Brown in the fall of 2004 and coached the Freshmen from 2004–2007. From 2004–2012, McGee's freshmen crews at Brown and Washington have captured three Eastern Sprints Championships, four Pac-10 Championships, three gold medals and one silver medal at the IRA National Championship, as well as winning Washington's first ever Temple Challenge Cup in 2010.

Coaching
Syracuse University Women's Rowing since 2018
USRowing Men's national team since 2012
University of Washington 2007–2012
Brown University 2004–2007

Education
Oxford University 2001 – 2002 including The Boat Race 2002
Brown University 1998 – 2001
Yale University 1997 – 1998
Loyola Academy 1993 – 1997

Rowing Record
2006: Senior World's USA Spare, Eton, England
2003: Senior World's USA 4+, Milan, Italy (gold)
2002: Senior World's USA 4-, Seville, Spain (12th)
2002: The Boat Race, Oxford Blue Boat (1st)
2001: Senior World’s USA 8+, Lucerne, Switzerland (4th)
2000: U23 USA 8+, Copenhagen, Denmark (bronze)
2000: Henley Royal Regatta Brown University Ladies Plate Champions
2000: Eastern Sprint Brown University Varsity 8+ (gold)
1999: U23 USA 8+, Hamburg, Germany (gold)
1999: Eastern Sprint Brown University Varsity 8+ (silver)
1997: Junior World Championships, USA 8+ (silver)
1997: Midwest Scholastic Championships (gold)

External links 
 Lucas McGee's USRowing profile

American male rowers
Oxford University Boat Club rowers
Alumni of Oriel College, Oxford
Year of birth missing (living people)
Living people
Washington Huskies rowing coaches
Yale Bulldogs rowers
Brown Bears rowers
Brown Bears rowing coaches
World Rowing Championships medalists for the United States